"Now That's Country" is a song written and recorded by American country music artist Marty Stuart.  It was released in September 1992 as the second single from the album This One's Gonna Hurt You.  The song reached #18 on the Billboard Hot Country Singles & Tracks chart.

Chart performance

References

Songs about country music
1992 singles 
Marty Stuart songs
Songs written by Marty Stuart
MCA Records singles
Music videos directed by John Lloyd Miller
Country rock songs
1992 songs